The western spotted gummy shark (Mustelus stevensi) is a species of houndshark in the family Triakidae, found in Australian waters. This new species of gummy sharks is a relatively large species.

References

External links
 Fishes of Australia : Mustelus stevensi

western spotted gummy shark
Vertebrates of Western Australia
Marine fish of Western Australia
western spotted gummy shark